Delaye is a surname. Notable people with the surname include:

Elisa Delaye-Fuchs (fl. 1872), Swiss composer and a Professor of Harmony at the Conservatoire de Musique de Genève
Guy Delaye (1929–1986), French professional rugby league footballer
Marguerite Delaye, French woman who fought during the siege of Montelimar by Admiral Coligny in April 1570
Philippe Delaye (born 1975), French professional footballer
Sacha Delaye (born 2002), French professional footballer

See also 
Delay (disambiguation)